Rosecrans (a form of Rosenkranz) may refer to:

People
Sylvester Horton Rosecrans (1827–1878), American Roman Catholic bishop
William Rosecrans (1819–1898), American army officer during the American Civil War

Places
Rosecrans, Illinois, an unincorporated community
Rosecrans, Wisconsin, an unincorporated community

Other
Note: All of the below are direct or indirect namesakes of General William Rosecrans (see above).
Rosecrans Avenue, a major east-west highway in Los Angeles and Orange Counties, California
Rosecrans Hills, Los Angeles County, California
Rosecrans (LACMTA station), station on the Los Angeles County Metropolitan Transit Authority System
Fort Rosecrans National Cemetery, San Diego, California
Rosecrans Air National Guard Base, Saint Joseph, Missouri
Rosecrans Memorial Airport, Buchanan County, Missouri
 Rosecrans (ship), a tanker lost off the mouth of the Columbia River, on January 14, 1913 -- see Coast Guard Station Point Adams
 U.S.A.T. Rosecrans two different troop ships operated by the Army Transport Service